Misha, Sohan Singh (30 August 1934 – 22 September 1986) was a Sahitya Akademi Award winning Punjabi poet.

Early life
Misha, Sohan Singh was born at village Bhent in Kapurthala district (British Punjab).

Awards
He received Sahitya Akademi award in 1978 for Kach de vastar (Poetry).

See also
List of Punjabi language poets

References

Punjabi-language poets
Recipients of the Sahitya Akademi Award in Punjabi
1934 births
1986 deaths
Indian male poets
20th-century Indian poets
Poets from Punjab, India
20th-century Indian male writers